Dustin Brown and Rameez Junaid were the defending champions but chose not to defend their title.

Mikhail Elgin and Andrei Vasilevski won the title after defeating Sander Gillé and Joran Vliegen 7–6(8–6), 6–4 in the final.

Seeds

Draw

References
 Main Draw

Cittadino Challenger - Doubles
Maserati Challenger